Mammary Lane is a listener request show featuring clips of The Howard Stern Show. The show airs on Howard 100 and Howard 101 on SIRIUS XM Radio, during certain weeks when the Stern Show is on vacation. The hosts of the show rotate and have included Richard Christy, Sal "The Stockbroker" Governale, Jason Kaplan, Will Murray, Gary Dell'Abate, and Jon Hein. The show is a production of "The Tapes Team" at SIRIUS, along with Master Tape Theatre, Stern Spotlight, The History of Howard Stern and Road Trip. Past Mammary Lane episodes are airing currently on Howard 101 in afternoon drivetime, 3-7 PM Eastern time, the time of day in which Bubba the Love Sponge had been broadcasting on Howard 101 prior to leaving Sirius due to unsuccessful contract negotiations.

Episodes

Episode 1: April 4, 2007
 Stuttering John's Stock Trading Prank On Gary
 Jackie Craps In The Stanley Cup
 January 12, 2004: Triumph The Insult Comic Dog Roasts Howard On His Birthday
 "Butt Cheek Fever" Bit
 April Fool's Prank On Gary
 November 19, 1999: Wack Pack Politically Incorrect with Bill Maher
 December 5, 1997: Howard Interviews Donny Osmond
 The Gary Puppet Gets Stolen
 July 26, 1990: Gary Says "Baba Booey" For The First Time
 August 18, 2004: KC Wins And Loses $330,000 On Gambling Web Site

Episode 2: April 5, 2007
Hosted by Richard Christy.

 Howard And Gary's Sega Channel Incident
 My Dead Lady Play
 May 15, 1996: Scott The Engineer Attacked By Kids
 January 17, 2002: Wrestler Booker T Visits
 Stuttering John Scams Steve Grillo
 Philly Zookeeper Funeral Song Parody Winners
 Fred's Name Change
 March 17, 2000: Hank The Dwarf And Beetlejuice Visit

Episode 3: November 19, 2007
Hosted by Jon Hein and Gary Dell'Abate.

 German Broadcasters Visit
 March 16, 2000: Kotex The Angry Jamaican Woman Calls
 January 12, 1995: Jan Michael Vincent Interview
 March 7, 2001: Gilbert Gottfried Segment
 August 15, 1995: Monkey Programs K-Rock
 January 5, 2005: Gary's Battleship Sleepover 
 May 9, 1997: Stuttering John Visits Boston University
 Tiny Tim Interview From 1988
 March 31, 2003: Lenny Kravitz Interview

Episode 4: February 18, 2008
Hosted by Jon Hein and Gary Dell'Abate.

 June 27, 2001: Password Game With Beetlejuice
 May 17, 1999: KC's Dick In A Box Story
 June 12, 2001: Gene Simmons And Craig Gass As Gene Simmons
 July 24, 1995: Howard Talks About F'ing The Skull Of Sally Jesse Raphael
 November 9, 1993: Corbin Bernsen Interview
 June 15, 2004: Artie As A Pig On Coke Story
 May 6, 1993: Brian May Interview
 May 10, 2002: Jason Biggs Interview
 August 20, 1996: Lars Ulrich Interview
 March 8, 1995: Howard Flips Out On Dallas Station General Manager
 January 23, 1990: Ted The Janitor As Mayor Barry
 February 22, 1999: Black Jeopardy

Episode 5: February 19, 2008
 January 9, 1987: Big Penis Contest
 September 23, 1998: Goo Goo Dolls Gay Wednesday
 February 8, 1995: Seth The Urine Drinker
 October 12, 2004: Comedian Mitch Hedberg Visits
 February 21, 1989: Brian Wilson Interview
 December 7, 1987: Howard Calls Japan On Pearl Harbor Day
 February 6, 1991: Baseball Player Steve Sax Interview
 February 12, 1992: Mark Harris Interview
 February 2, 1998: Sal The Stockbroker Strikes Again

Episode 6: April 16, 2008
Hosted by Jon Hein and Gary Dell'Abate.

 March 13, 2001: Hypnotist Paul McKenna Hypnotizes Fred
 May 15, 1996: Howard's Prank Call
 October 28, 1994: Scott Baio Interview
 February 3, 2005: Anson Williams Interview
 February 2, 1995: Corbin Bernsen Interview
 June 26, 1996: Fake Kelly Le Brock
 December 8, 1994: Carly Simon Interview
 November 19, 2001: Johnny Rebel Interview
 March 23, 2001: Judy Garland Tapes
 September 22, 1997: Steven Tyler And Joe Perry Interview

Episode 7: April 17, 2008
Hosted by Jon Hein and Gary Dell'Abate.

 March 19, 1997: The Rap Summit
 August 17, 1995: Howard Makes Robin The Boss Of Gary And Scott
 September 28, 1995: Kenneth Keith Kallenbach And Girlfriend Visit
 September 23, 1991: David Cassidy Interview
 February 4, 2002: UFO Guy Interview
 August 9, 2001: Darrell Hammond Interview
 1988, 1989, June 4, 2003: A Few Guess Who's The Jew Segments
 May 26, 1993: Howard Punishes His Audience
 November 16, 2005: Rush Limbaugh Discussion
 Bob And Ray Compilation from 1991

Episode 8: February 16, 2009
For the week February 16–19, 2009 a "Mammary Lane Marathon" was played and was hosted by Jon Hein and Gary Dell'Abate.

June 8, 2000: Enrique Iglesias sings live in the studio
 July 30, 1993: Gilbert Gottfried sits in during Robin's news
 February 8, 1991: Stuttering John
 October 16, 2002: Yucko the Clown "calls in from Maryland" during sniper shootings with a target on him
 September 30, 1999: Roseanne visits and Tom Arnold calls in
 January 28, 1993: Bobby Vinton sings the national anthem
 July 31, 2001: Snoop Dogg and Tha Eastsidaz visit
 March 22, 2001: King of All Blacks guesses garbage
 January 14, 2003: Martin Lawrence visits
 June 2, 1987: Gary's breath judged by a workman
 August 7, 1998: Robin's family in the studio

Episode 9: February 17, 2009
For the week February 16–19, 2009 a "Mammary Lane Marathon" was played and was hosted by Jon Hein and Gary Dell'Abate.

 February 10, 1995: Ralph loses bet and dresses in drag
 July 30, 1997: Crazy Alice's first call to the show
 October 22, 1997: Gilbert Gottfried at Amy Heckerling’s House
 October 10, 2000: A man who taxidermied his daughter visits
 March 8, 2000: Pig Olympics
 August 4, 2000: Beetlejuice running for Senator
 February 13, 2002: Raymond Norman's tape on Oprah Winfrey
 October 8, 2004: Howard hates Ronnie the Limo Driver’s new limousine
 August 19, 1998: Wesley Snipes visits
 November 16, 2004: Robin's news segment about a man lighting himself on fire
 June 23, 1999: Freaky Feud with Penthouse Pets and Wack Pack members
 May 18, 2001: “Kataleen” Turner and Artie

Episode 10: February 18, 2009
For the week February 16–19, 2009 a "Mammary Lane Marathon" was played and was hosted by Jon Hein and Gary Dell'Abate.

 September 30, 1992: Richard Simmons visits
 January 20, 2005: Woman who slept with her stepson calls in
 January 23, 2002: Artie's Mike Tyson impersonation
 April 4, 2005: Pat O'Brien and Pope discussions
 April 4, 1996: Gilbert Gottfried calls in as "Rabbi Gottfried"
 May 5, 1997: Mia Farrow visits
 March 15, 1996: John F. Kennedy Jr. visits
 August 15, 2002: Boxer Laila Ali calls in
 September 11, 2000: Song parody contest
 September 14, 2000: Song parody contest winners announced

Episode 11: February 19, 2009
For the week February 16–19, 2009 a "Mammary Lane Marathon" was played and was hosted by Jon Hein and Gary Dell'Abate.

 January 27, 1998: Robert Duvall visits
 April 14, 2000: The Gossip Game with guest Flavor Flav
 May 7, 1996: Ozzy Osbourne calls in and goofs on Stuttering John
 April 14, 2000: Matthew McConaughey visits
 May 4, 2004: Goofing on Heather Wilson
 June 26, 1992: Billy West doing his Ross Perot impersonation
 November 28, 2001: Penthouse Pet Megan Mason spins The Wheel of Sex
 January 25, 2002: Yaqi the Tickler visits
 April 22, 2002: Woman visits to help Robin speak to her horses
 September 12, 2005: Fred the Elephant Boy soils himself

External links
Howard 100 Channel Guide
Sirius Howard 100
Howard Stern’s Official Website
Stern Fan Network
Sirius Backstage's Howard Stern Forum
Mammary Lane Theme Song on Reddit

Sirius Satellite Radio
2007 radio programme debuts
Howard Stern